The Dawn of Day or Dawn or Daybreak (historical orthography: Morgenröthe – Gedanken über die moralischen Vorurtheile; English: The Dawn of Day/ Daybreak: Thoughts on the Prejudices of Morality) is an 1881 book by the German philosopher Friedrich Nietzsche. According to the Nietzsche scholar Keith Ansell-Pearson, it is the least studied of all of Nietzsche's works.

Themes
Nietzsche de-emphasizes the role of hedonism as a motivator and accentuates the role of a "feeling of power." His relativism, both moral and cultural, and his critique of Christianity also reach greater maturity. In Daybreak Nietzsche devotes a lengthy passage to his criticism of Christian biblical exegesis, including its arbitrary interpretation of objects and images in the Old Testament as prefigurations of Christ's crucifixion.

The polemical, antagonistic and informal style of this aphoristic book, when compared to Nietzsche's later treatments of morality, seems to invite a particular experience. In this text Nietzsche is not concerned with persuading his readers to accept any specific point of view, yet there are prefigurations of many of the ideas more fully developed in his later books. For example, the materialism espoused in this book might seem reducible to a naive scientific objectivism that reduces all phenomena to their natural, mechanical causes, but that is not Nietzsche's strongest perspective, which is perhaps best expressed in The Gay Science.

Nietzsche in (93) acknowledges that a universe does not come from God or a creator but physics and science.  The aphorism (93) begins from the question in the gospel of John (18:38).   This interpretation and development of his thought were to prove errors in dogmatic teaching of Christianity that power and not divinity is the psychology of belief.

Translations

References

External links

1881 non-fiction books
Books by Friedrich Nietzsche